Tekirler, Nallıhan is a village in the District of Nallıhan, Ankara Province, Turkey.

History 
The name of the village is mentioned as Tekfurlar in records from 1521. Previously, it was a part of Bilecik Söğüt district Mihalgazi township, but in 22 October 1929' also connected to Nallıhan district of Ankara.

Geography 
It is 221 kilometers from Ankara and 60 kilometers from Nallıhan district center.

Population

References

Villages in Nallıhan District